Ray Silke (born 17 August 1970) is a former Irish sportsperson. He played Gaelic football with his local club Corofin and was their centre-back and captain when they won the All-Ireland on St Patrick's Day in 1998. 

Corofin were the first Connacht Club to ever win the Andy Kerrigan Cup in '98 and the club won it several more times after that.  

He was also a member of the Galway senior inter-county team from the 1990s until 2001. Silke captained Galway to their first All-Ireland title thirty-two years in 1998 when they defeated Mick O' Dwyer's Kildare in the final.

References

 

1970 births
Living people
Corofin Gaelic footballers
Galway inter-county Gaelic footballers
Irish schoolteachers
Connacht inter-provincial Gaelic footballers
All-Ireland-winning captains (football)
Winners of one All-Ireland medal (Gaelic football)